David Chalmers (1897 – 1961) was a Scottish footballer who played as an inside left for Clydebank in the first and second tiers of the Scottish Football League during the 1920s, playing alongside Jimmy McGrory for a season. He had earlier played for Junior side St Anthony's and been selected to play for Scotland at that level.

His son, Stevie Chalmers, played for Celtic and Scotland, scoring the goal which won the 1967 European Cup Final; he credited his father as a quiet influence and an example to follow in his early life. David's grandson (Stevie's son), Paul Chalmers, also played professionally.

References

1897 births
1961 deaths
Association football inside forwards
Scottish Junior Football Association players
Scotland junior international footballers
Clydebank F.C. (1914) players
Scottish Football League players
Scottish footballers
St Anthony's F.C. players
Footballers from Hamilton, South Lanarkshire